Jemez Mountains Electric Cooperative is the rural utility cooperative providing electricity to the residents of Sandoval, McKinley, San Juan, Santa Fe, and Rio Arriba counties. Jemez Mountains Electric Cooperative, Inc. has three offices. The main office in Hernandez, an office in Jemez Springs, and an office in Cuba. It is New Mexico's largest electric cooperative in geographical size and membership base and is governed by an eleven member board of trustees elected by the membership to operate affairs.

Board of Trustees

References

External links
Jemez Mountains Electric Cooperative

Electric cooperatives in New Mexico
Electric cooperatives of the United States